Holoaden luederwaldti is a species of frog in the family Strabomantidae.
It is endemic to Brazil.
Its natural habitats are subtropical or tropical high-altitude shrubland, subtropical or tropical high-altitude grassland, and rocky areas.
It is threatened by habitat loss.

References

Holoaden
Endemic fauna of Brazil
Amphibians of Brazil
Taxa named by Alípio de Miranda-Ribeiro
Amphibians described in 1920
Taxonomy articles created by Polbot